Sivert Høyem (born 22 January 1976) is a Norwegian musician, best known as the vocalist of the rock band Madrugada. After the band broke up following the death of Robert Burås in 2007, he has enjoyed success as a solo artist and is also a member of The Volunteers with whom he released the album Exiles in 2006.

Early and personal life

Høyem is a son of forestry teacher Asbjørn Høyem and politician Jørun Drevland. He hails from Kleiva in Sortland, and attended Sortland Upper Secondary School before moving to Oslo in 1995. Whilst pursuing a music career he minored in history at the University of Oslo.

Music career

Madrugada
Høyem rose to fame in the late 1990s when Madrugada made their Norwegian breakthrough with debut album Industrial Silence. The band members included Sivert Høyem (vocals), Frode Jacobsen (bass), and Robert Burås (guitar). After the death of Burås on 12 July 2007, Høyem and Jacobsen decided to finish recording their latest album. The album, entitled Madrugada, was released on 21 January 2008. After the release of the album the band announced they would split after one last tour. They performed their last ever concert on 15 November 2008 at Oslo Spektrum.

Solo
He has the last few years had success as a solo artist, releasing the albums Ladies and Gentlemen of the Opposition (2004), Moon Landing (2009) and Long Slow Distance (2011), Endless Love (2014) and Lioness (2016).

He formed his band the Volunteers made up of:
Sivert Høyem: Vocals/Guitar/Songwriter
Cato Salsa: Guitars/Keyboards
Børge Fjordheim: Drums/Shaker/Tambourine
Rudi Nikolaisen: Bass (Live)
Kalle Gustafson Jerneholm: Bass (On Record)
Christer Knutsen: Guitars/Keyboards

He released the album Exiles in 2006 credited to Sivert Høyem & the Volunteers. He toured with his band in May 2007 playing at festivals across Norway. In December 2009 he concluded another tour with his new band. In April 2012 in a radio interview at the "Rock Show" radio program in Greece, he clearly stated that there won't be any other album with the Volunteers.

In September 2010 Sivert Høyem launched the song "Prisoner of the road" in order to raise awareness for NRC, which is this year's recipient of the Norwegian National Telethon.

In 2015, "Black & Gold" was chosen to be the opening song of the Norwegian TV series Okkupert ("Occupied").

Discography

Albums
With the band Madrugada
1999: Industrial Silence
2001: The Nightly Disease
CD: The Nightly Disease Vol. II
2002: Grit
2005: The Deep End
2005: Live at Tralfamadore
2008: Madrugada
Solo

As Sivert Høyem & the Volunteers

As Guest Vocalist
2013: Vocals on the song "Phoenix" on Satyricon's 2013 self-titled studio album.
2020: Vocals on the song "Coming Home" on Me and that Man's "New Man, New Songs, Same Shit, Vol. 1" album

Singles

As Sivert Høyem & the Volunteers

References

External links
 Official website
 

1976 births
Living people
People from Sortland
Norwegian rock singers
Norwegian songwriters
English-language singers from Norway
21st-century Norwegian singers
21st-century Norwegian male singers